Ainsley Hall (born 23 June 1972 in Jamaica) is a Cayman Islands cricketer. A right-handed batsman and wicket-keeper, he has played for the Cayman Islands national cricket team since 2005.

Playing career

Ainsley Hall made his debut for the Cayman Islands in the repêchage tournament for the 2005 ICC Trophy in Kuala Lumpur in February 2005. He played three matches in the tournament, winning the man of the match award against Italy after top-scoring with 51 in the Cayman Islands' innings. He made his first-class debut in August of that year, playing against Bermuda and Canada in the 2005 ICC Intercontinental Cup at the Toronto Cricket, Skating and Curling Club.

The following year, he played for the Cayman Islands in their two Stanford 20/20 matches against the Bahamas and Trinidad & Tobago. He most recently represented the Cayman Islands at Division Three of the World Cricket League in Darwin, Australia in May/June 2007.

References

1972 births
Living people
Caymanian cricketers
Jamaican emigrants to the Cayman Islands
Wicket-keepers